Jack Bauer is a character from the TV series 24.

Jack Bauer may also refer to:

 Jack Bauer (cyclist) (born 1985), New Zealand road racing cyclist
 K. Jack Bauer (1926–1987), American naval historian
 Jack Bauer, the antagonist from the 2001 film Zebra Lounge.

See also
John Bauer (disambiguation)